DnaA is a protein that activates initiation of DNA replication in bacteria. Based on the Replicon Model, a positively active initiator molecule contacts with a particular spot on a circular chromosome called the replicator to start DNA replication. It is a replication initiation factor which promotes the unwinding of DNA at oriC. The DnaA proteins found in all bacteria engage with the DnaA boxes to start chromosomal replication. In addition to the DnaA protein, its concentration, binding to DnaA-boxes, and binding of ATP or ADP, we will cover the regulation of the DnaA gene, the unique characteristics of the DnaA gene expression, promoter strength, and translation efficiency. The onset of the initiation phase of DNA replication is determined by the concentration of DnaA. DnaA accumulates during growth and then triggers the initiation of replication. Replication begins with active DnaA binding to 9-mer (9-bp) repeats upstream of oriC. Binding of DnaA leads to strand separation at the 13-mer repeats. This binding causes the DNA to loop in preparation for melting open by the helicase DnaB.

Function 
DnaA consists mainly in two different forms, the active ATP-form and the inactive ADP. The level of active DnaA within a cell is low immediately after a cell has divided. Although the active form of DnaA requires ATP, the formation of the oriC/DnaA complex and subsequent DNA unwinding does not require ATP hydrolysis.

The oriC site in E. coli has three AT rich 13 base pair regions (DUEs)  followed by four 9 bp regions with the sequence TTAT(C or A)CA(C or A)A. Around 10 DnaA molecules bind to the 9 bp regions, which wrap around the proteins causing the DNA at the AT-rich region to unwind. There are 8 DnaA binding sites within oriC, to which DnaA binds with differential affinity. When DNA replication is about to commence, DnaA occupies all of the high and low affinity binding sites. The denatured AT-rich region allows for the recruitment of DnaB (helicase), which complexes with DnaC (helicase loader). DnaC helps the helicase to bind to and to properly accommodate the ssDNA at the 13 bp region; this is accomplished by ATP hydrolysis, after which DnaC is released. Single-strand binding proteins (SSBs) stabilize the single DNA strands in order to maintain the replication bubble. DnaB is a 5'→3' helicase, so it travels on the lagging strand. It associates with DnaG (a primase) to form the only primer for the leading strand and to add RNA primers on the lagging strand. The interaction between DnaG and DnaB is necessary to control the longitude of Okazaki fragments on the lagging strand. DNA polymerase III is then able to start DNA replication.

DnaA is made up of four domains: the first is the N-terminal that associates with regulatory proteins, the second is a helical linker region, the third domain is a AAA+ region that binds to ATP, and the fourth domain is the C-terminal DNA binding region. DnaA contains two conserved regions: the first is located in the central part of the protein and corresponds to the ATP-binding domain, the second is located in the C-terminal half and is involved in DNA-binding.

DnaA mutants 
The first strains to have the dnaA gene mutated were the temperature-sensitive K-12 strains CRT46 and CRT83, with the corresponding strain numbers beingdnaA46 and dnaA83. In contrary to dnaA mutants, the PC2 strain has a mutation in the dnaC gene, which codes for the loading factor for the DNA helicase dnaB.

Synthesis 
DnaA has the ability to bind its own promoter. When DnaA binds to its own promoter it blocks RNA polymerase from binding the promoter and inhibits initiation of transcription. In this way, DnaA is able to regulate its own expression. This process is called autoregulation.

Regulation 
Each cell division cycle triggers a new round of chromosome replication by DnaA, the initiator protein. It is crucial to regulate DnaA-ATP monomer interactions with oriC during helicase loading and unwinding of origin DNA for precise timing. DnaA recognition sites in Escherichia coli are arranged in OriC to facilitate staged pre-replication complex assembling, with DnaA interacting with low affinity sites at it oligomerizes to fill the gaps between high affinity sites as it oligomerizes. There may be numerous gap-filling strategies to link OriC functions to bacterial lifestyles in nature, which may account for the wide variability of OriC DnaA recognition site patterns. The two forms of DnaA, the active ATP- and ADP-form are regulated. The ATP-form is converted to the ADP-form through either Regulatory inactivation of DnaA (RIDA), which in turn consists of the Hda protein and the β sliding clamp (DnaN) and datA-dependent DnaA-ATP hydrolysis. The ADP-form is converted to the ATP-form by DnaA-reactivating sequences 1 and 2 (DARS1 and DARS2).

DnaA protein structure 
There are four disciplines within the DnaA protein. An initial comparison of Escherichia coli and Bacillus subtilis proteins led to the discovery of a sphere structure, which revealed a relatively conserved N-terminus and a largely conserved large C-terminus separated by a region that was mostly variable. As an example, the Enterobacterial proteins have nearly identical N- and C-terminal sequences, however they are characterized by numerous amino acid adjustments, elisions, and insertions in the variable regions. There is an AAA+ family ATPase motif and an independent DNA binding sphere in the C-terminal region. It was determined by NMR that Escherichia coli sphere IV had a crystal-clear structure when complexed with a DnaA- box. As a result, it was confirmed that the DNA list is intermediated by a combination of a helix-turn-helix motif and an introductory circle. When bound to ATP, but not to ADP, DnaA forms a super-helical structure with four monomers per turn. The structure of sphere I has been determined from three additional bacterial species and Escherichia coli by NMR.

Autoregulation of DnaA protein synthesis 

The research on dnaA(Ts) mutants provided the first proof that the dnaA gene is autoregulated. DnaA protein is still produced at non-permissive temperatures where it is inactive, but in some mutants it can be made active again by returning to a temperature that is conducive to development. This reversible initiation capacity—which was larger than anticipated given the mass gain of the culture—could be seen in the absence of protein synthesis at the permissive temperature and suggested that the DnaA protein synthesis was derepressed at the high growth temperature. These results prompted a thorough investigation of the dnaA46 mutant under permissive, intermediate, and non-permissive development conditions. The study's findings revealed that as growth temperature increased, the DnaA46 protein's activity decreased, leading to progressively decreasing DNA and origin concentrations at intermediate temperatures. An increase in initiation capacity was seen concurrently with a decrease in DnaA protein activity. Hansen and Rasmussen (1977) argued that the DnaA protein had a positive effect in replication initiation aing transcripts entering the dnaA gene were found as a result of sequencing the dnaA promoter region and the dnaA gene. The DnaA promoter region has nine GATC sites within 225 base pairs, and a sequence that is similar to nd a negative role in its own synthesis based on these observations. Two promoters providrepetitions (DnaA-boxes) in the oriC region was found between the two promoters. According to several studies, the DnaA protein negatively regulates both promoters. In these research, it was discovered that the dnaA transcription was upregulated by 4- to 5-fold at non-permissive temperatures in dnaATs mutants and repressed by the same amount when DnaA protein was overproduced. The autoregulation of the dnaA gene requires the DnaA-box. The sequence of the dnaA2p promoter region has some intriguing characteristics that can be seen more clearly. This promoter contains two GATC sites, one in the 10 sequence and the other in the 35 sequence, and both in vivo and in vitro, methylation increases transcription from this promoter by a factor of two. In addition, DnaA protein binds to regions upstream of the dnaA2p promoter with a high affinity.

See also 
Origin recognition complex

References

Further reading

External links 
 

Biomolecules
DNA replication